Bernard Herman Hungling [Bud] (March 5, 1896 – March 30, 1968) was a reserve catcher in Major League Baseball who played between  and  for the Brooklyn Robins (1922–1923) and St. Louis Browns (1930). He was born in Dayton, Ohio.

In a three-season career, Hungling was a .241 hitter (33-for-137) with one home run and 15 RBI in 51 games, including 13 runs, three doubles, two triples, and two stolen bases.

His minor league career stretched from 1916 through 1932.

Hungling died in his hometown of Dayton, Ohio at age 72.

External links

Brooklyn Robins players
St. Louis Browns players
Major League Baseball catchers
Baseball players from Dayton, Ohio
1896 births
1968 deaths
Springfield Reapers players
Rochester Hustlers players
Shreveport Gassers players
Memphis Chickasaws players
Des Moines Boosters players
Beaumont Exporters players
Dallas Steers players
San Antonio Bears players
Syracuse Stars (minor league baseball) players
Toronto Maple Leafs (International League) players
Newark Bears (IL) players
Wichita Falls Spudders players
Milwaukee Brewers (minor league) players
Dayton Ducks players
Galveston Buccaneers players